La Vallée-de-la-Gatineau (The Valley of the Gatineau) is a regional county municipality in the Outaouais region of western Quebec, Canada. The seat is in Gracefield. It was incorporated on January 1, 1983 and was named for its location straddling the Gatineau River north of Low.

It consists of two cities, fifteen municipalities, and five unorganized territories. The area also has two Algonquin communities, Rapid Lake in the heart of the La Vérendrye Wildlife Reserve and Kitigan Zibi.

The territory of the Gatineau Valley is bordered by other Outaouais RCMs: to the east by the Antoine-Labelle Regional County Municipality, to the southeast by Papineau RCM, to the south by the Les Collines-de-l'Outaouais RCM and to the west by the Pontiac Regional County Municipality. To the north is La Vallée-de-l'Or Regional County Municipality in the Abitibi-Témiscamingue region. Numerous lakes abound in area, including everything from the small Lac des Pins  to 31 Mile Lake.

The administrative centre for La Vallée-de-la-Gatineau is north of Kitigan Zibi in Maniwaki, previously the county seat of historic Gatineau County.

Subdivisions
There are 22 subdivisions within the RCM:

Cities & Towns (2)
 Gracefield
 Maniwaki

Municipalities (13)
 Blue Sea
 Bois-Franc
 Bouchette
 Cayamant
 Déléage
 Denholm
 Egan-Sud
 Grand-Remous
 Kazabazua
 Lac-Sainte-Marie
 Messines
 Moncerf-Lytton
 Sainte-Thérèse-de-la-Gatineau

Townships (2)
 Aumond
 Low

Unorganized Territory (5)
 Cascades-Malignes
 Dépôt-Échouani
 Lac-Lenôtre
 Lac-Moselle
 Lac-Pythonga

First Nation Reserve (2)
 Kitigan Zibi
 Rapid Lake

Transportation

Access routes
Highways and numbered routes that run through the municipality, including external routes that start or finish at the county border:

 Autoroutes
 None
 Principal highways
 
 
 
 Secondary highways
 None

See also
 List of regional county municipalities and equivalent territories in Quebec

References

External links

 Official website (in French)
 Gatineau Valley Tourism site
 Gatineau Valley Development agency

Regional county municipalities in Outaouais
Census divisions of Quebec